John Kivela (May 14, 1969 – May 9, 2017) was an American politician who served as a member of the Michigan House of Representatives from 2013 until his death in 2017, and as Mayor of Marquette, Michigan, from 2008 until 2012.

Kivela was first elected in 2012. His district consisted of Alger, Luce and Schoolcraft counties and part of Marquette County.

His family owned an automotive repair and distributor business in Marquette.

Death
Kivela was found dead on May 9, 2017, at a home he owned in Lansing, Michigan. He hanged himself. Hours earlier, he was released from jail following his second arrest for drunk driving. After his first arrest in 2015, he acknowledged he had a lifelong drinking problem and said he was seeking help.

References

1969 births
2017 suicides
21st-century American politicians
American politicians who committed suicide
Democratic Party members of the Michigan House of Representatives
Mayors of places in Michigan
People from Marquette, Michigan
Businesspeople from Michigan
Suicides by hanging in Michigan
20th-century American businesspeople
2017 deaths